Skeleton in the closet or skeleton in the cupboard is a colloquial phrase and idiom used to describe an undisclosed fact about someone which, if revealed, would damage perceptions of the person. It evokes the idea of someone having had a human corpse concealed in their home so long that all its flesh had decomposed to the bone. "Cupboard" may be used in British English instead of the American English word "closet". It is known to have been used as a phrase, at least as early as November 1816, in the monthly British journal The Eclectic Review, page 468. It is listed in both the Oxford English Dictionary, and Webster's Dictionary, under the word "skeleton". The "Cambridge Academic Content Dictionary" lists it under this but also as a separate idiom. In the most derisive of usage, murder, or significant culpability in a years-old disappearance or non-understood event (a mystery), may be implied by the phrase.

See also

Closeted, describing nondisclosure of sexual or gender identity
Elephant in the room, an English metaphorical idiom for an obvious truth that is being ignored or goes unaddressed
Nigger in the woodpile (archaic) means "some fact of considerable importance that is not disclosed—something suspicious or wrong"

References

External links
http://www.onestopenglish.com/community/your-english/phrase-of-the-week/phrase-of-the-week-to-have-a-skeleton-in-the-cupboard/145671.article
http://www.phrases.org.uk/meanings/skeleton-in-the-closet.html

English-language idioms
Metaphors referring to people
Metaphors referring to objects
Secrecy
Obfuscation